Alexandros Papanastasiou (8 July 1876 – 17 November 1936) was a Greek lawyer, sociologist and politician who served twice as the Prime Minister of Greece in the interwar period, being a pioneer in the establishment of the Second Hellenic Republic.

Early years 
Papanastasiou was born on 8 July 1876 in  Tripoli to Panagiotis Papanastasiou, a member of Parliament and Marigo Rogari-Apostolopoulou. He spent part of his childhood in Kalamata (1876–1883) and Piraeus (1883–1889). He studied law at the National and Kapodistrian University of Athens (1895–1898), earning his doctorate in 1899 and a licence in 1901. From 1901 to 1905 he studied social science, law and philosophy at the Friedrich-Wilhelms-Universität of Berlin and in Heidelberg. In 1905 he goes to London, later on to Paris, continuing with his studies until 1907, when he decides to return to Greece. In 1908 with Alexandros Delmouzos founded the "Society of sociologists". He tried to combine political activity with scientific research.

Political career 

In 1910, Papanastasiou was elected for the first time to the Hellenic Parliament. He fought for agrarian reform in Thessaly seeking to break up the big farms that existed there since the rule of the Ottoman Empire and redistribute them to the local farmers. In 1916, he joined the Provisional Government of National Defence of Eleftherios Venizelos in Thessaloniki which sought to bring Greece at the side of the Allies of World War I. He was immediately rewarded with the governorship of the Ionian Islands.

After World War I, Papanastasiou took part in several Venizelos governments as Minister of Transportation, Minister of National Health and Interior Minister. When Venizelos lost the 1920 elections, he remained in Greece and criticised the People's Party governments under the successive Prime Ministers Dimitrios Rallis, Nikolaos Kalogeropoulos, Dimitrios Gounaris, Nikolaos Stratos and Petros Protopapadakis for their mishandling of the ongoing Greco-Turkish War of 1919–1922.

In 1921, along with others, he published a document entitled the Republican/Democratic Manifesto (Δημοκρατικό Μανιφέστο), which criticised the monarchy, warning for future destruction in the Asian Minor front and finally calling Constantine I to resign, so Greece to survive. He stated that Greece was "the creation of the spirit, labour and struggles of her children. It is not the property of Royalty and no part of Greece can be sacrificed for the sake of personal interests of her monarch." For the publication of this manifesto, Papanastasiou was imprisoned along with the other signatories after a trial. Georgios Papandreou was his defender.

When the People's Party government collapsed, following the Asia Minor Disaster, Papanastasiou formed a government which, at his insistence, on March 25, 1924, proclaimed a Republic. The issue was submitted to a plebiscite with the voters approving the abolition of the monarchy on April 13, 1924. During his term of office, Papanastasiou also made proposals for the establishment of the University of Thessaloniki, the recognition of the common, demotic Greek language, the establishment of adult education centres, etc. In 1926, Papanastasiou founded the Democratic Union.

From 1926 until 1928, he was Minister of Agriculture and was instrumental in the establishment of the Agricultural Bank of Greece. Papanastasiou briefly served as Prime Minister once more between May and June 1932. In 1936, he was placed under house arrest by the government of Ioannis Metaxas.

Papanastasiou died of a heart attack on November 17, 1936.

Bibliography 
 Αλέξανδρος Παπαναστασίου: Θεσμοί, Ιδεολογία και Πολιτική στο Μεσοπόλεμο. Πολύτυπο, Αθήνα 1987 (συλλογικός τόμος, πρακτικά συνεδρίου).

References 

 Georg Veloudis, "Papanastasiu, Alexandros", in Biographisches Lexikon zur Geschichte Südosteuropas. Vol. 3. Munich 1979, pp. 391–393.

 
1876 births
1936 deaths
19th-century Greek people
20th-century prime ministers of Greece
Greek sociologists
Republicanism in Greece
Greek nationalists
Greek socialists
Eastern Orthodox Christians from Greece
European democratic socialists
Greek Freemasons
Prisoners and detainees of Greece
People from Tripoli, Greece
National and Kapodistrian University of Athens alumni
Foreign ministers of Greece
Agriculture ministers of Greece
Prime Ministers of Greece
Burials at the First Cemetery of Athens
Ministers of the Interior of Greece